Ptarmigan Peak is the highest summit of the South Williams Fork Mountains range in the Rocky Mountains of North America.  The peak is north of Dillon, CO in the White River National Forest.

See also

List of Colorado mountain ranges
List of Colorado mountain summits
List of Colorado fourteeners
List of Colorado 4000 meter prominent summits
List of the most prominent summits of Colorado
List of Colorado county high points

References

External links
Trail to the summit - https://www.hikingproject.com/trail/7002492

Mountains of Colorado
Mountains of Grand County, Colorado
Mountains of Summit County, Colorado
North American 3000 m summits